Stanley Grinstein (November 26, 1927 – March 2, 2014) was an American businessman, master printer, arts collector and patron, philanthropist, and social activist.

Early life and education
Stanley Grinstein was born in Seattle, Washington and attended the University of Washington. His family relocated to Los Angeles in his sophomore year and Grinstein transferred to the University of Southern California. He started a scrap metal business with his father and eventually grew a business in the selling and renting of forklifts.

Los Angeles arts activities
In 1952, Grinstein married his wife, Elyse, and the two began collecting art. Among the "most important catalysts to the Los Angeles art scene was Stanley Grinstein, one of the founders of Gemini G.E.L. (Graphic Editions Limited); he and his wife, Elyse, have often been hailed as 'the godparents of the L.A. art scene.' "

"The Grinsteins have collected works by numerous artists from Southern California. They also helped introduce L.A. artists to a large network of international artists, both through their work in the studios of Gemini, and at the famed receptions and gatherings that the Grinsteins hosted at their home."

Gemini G.E.L.
Grinstein co-founded Gemini G.E.L. with his college friend Sidney Felsen in Los Angeles, "a seminal art print firm where a pantheon of artists created lithograph series and other works. Among those who created pieces at the high-tech workshop on Melrose Avenue over the years were David Hockney, Robert Rauschenberg, Ed Kienholz, Ed Ruscha, Ellsworth Kelly, Richard Serra, Roy Lichtenstein and many more."

Personal life
Stanley and Elyse Grinstein had three daughters:  Ayn, Ellen and Nancy. Elyse, an architect and prolific art collector in her own right, co-founded the Los Angeles publishing house Gemini G.E.L. before her death in 2016.

Notes

External links
http://www.geminigel.com

1927 births
2014 deaths
University of Washington alumni
University of California, Los Angeles alumni
American businesspeople
American printmakers